Sir Charles Jones (born April 25, 1973) is an American blues and Southern Soul singer.

Biography
Jones was born in Akron, Ohio. When he was young, his family moved to Birmingham, Alabama, where he was raised. It was in Birmingham where his singing career started. Jones taught himself how to write his own music, as well as arranging and producing it. In his early career, he worked under the guidance and tutelage of Marvin Sease. His style ranges from jazz to fusion, and from gospel to blues. He also sang Just Can't Let Go which was one of his top songs in the Blues/R&B area.

His first album, Sir Charles Jones, was released in 2000. A review in Living Blues praised Jones' vocals and stated, "for a largely-programmed effort, this disk percolates with sensuality and emotional heat." Jones' next album, Love Machine, spent 57 weeks on the U.S. Billboard Top R&B/Hip-Hop Albums chart, where it peaked at number 28 in June 2002. Living Blues credited the ballad "Is There Anybody Lonely?" for increasing the attention on Jones by soul and blues radio. The magazine added, "his success bodes well for the future of soul/blues as a viable contemporary music."

A motorcycle accident in 2003 left Jones in a coma for several days. After a long and full recovery, he released Thank You for Holding On in 2006. Two years later, he released a compilation album, My Story, and a music DVD, Sir Charles Jones: His Life & Times - Undisputed King of Southern Soul.

Awards
American Blues Network:
 International Entertainer of the year 2001-2004
 Album of the Year 2002 & 2003
B.B. King Achievement Award 2003 & 2004

Discography

Studio albums

Video album
Sir Charles Jones: His Life & Times - Undisputed King of Southern Soul (2008)

References

External links
Sir Charles Jones. Malaco. 19 September 2006
Biography - 19 September 2006

Living people
American blues singers
1973 births
21st-century American singers